Mytheresa is a German e-commerce luxury fashion company, with headquarters in Munich, Germany. Founded in 2006, it operates local-language based websites for international markets in English, German, Spanish, French, Italian, Arabic, Chinese and Korean. Its CEO is Michael Kliger.

In January 2021, Mytheresa filed an IPO on the New York Stock Exchange that valued the company at $2.2 billion; its valuation increased to $3 billion on its first day of trading.

Background 

The Mytheresa online shop was founded in 2006 by Susanne and Christoph Botschen and is associated with the multi-brand store in Munich (previously THERESA. store). Their selection consists of high-end clothing, shoes, bags and accessories from luxury designer brands such as Bottega Veneta, Burberry, Fendi, Gucci, Moncler, Loro Piana and many more. 

As an international retailer, Mytheresa operates in 8 languages: English, German, French, Italian, Spanish, Arabic, Chinese and Korean  .
 
In January 2019 Mytheresa launched a kidswear category  and January 2020 saw the launch of Mytheresa Men. A new homeware and lifestyle category Life followed in May 2022. In 2022, Mytheresa expanded its luxury offering to home décor and lifestyle products with the launch of the category “LIFE”.

References

See also
YOOX Net-a-Porter Group
Farfetch
Gilt Groupe
Luxury goods

Online clothing retailers of Germany
Companies listed on the New York Stock Exchange
2021 initial public offerings
Companies based in Munich